Pierre Favre (born 2 June 1937) is a Swiss jazz drummer and percussionist born in Le Locle, Switzerland.

1964 Pierre Favre joins Paiste: At the 1964 Paiste drummer meeting in Frankfurt, Pierre met the Paiste brothers who invited him to visit their factory in Nottwil. Since Pierre has always been interested in cymbals, he was most enthusiastic about accepting their invitation. The Paiste brothers were so impressed with his keen interest and attentive attitude, they offered him a position on their staff to take care of the most important task: cymbal development, quality control and to establish an education/drummer service dept. Pierre left Paiste as a full time employee in 1970 and was replaced by Fredy Studer.

He recorded the album Singing Drums (ECM, 1984) with Paul Motian and Nana Vasconcelos. He also appears on the John Surman album, Such Winters of Memory (1983). He has recorded with several well-known musicians, including Tamia, Michel Godard, Mal Waldron, Paul Giger, Jiří Stivín, Michel Portal, Samuel Blaser, the ARTE Quartett, and Barre Phillips.

Select discography

As leader
 Pierre Favre Quartet (Wergo)
 Santana (FMP)
 Pierre Favre European Chamber Ensemble (Intakt)
 Singing Drums (ECM 1984)
 Window Steps (ECM, 1996)
 Fleuve (ECM, 2006)

With Irene Schweizer
 Irene Schweizer & Pierre Favre (Intakt)
 Portrait (Intakt)
 Ulrichsberg (Intakt)

With Samuel Blaser
 Vol à Voile (Intakt, 2010)
 Same Place, Another Time (Blaser Music, 2022)

With Philipp Schaufelberger
 Albatros (Intakt, 2010)

With John Surman
 Such Winters of Memory (ECM, 1982)
 Upon Reflection

With Tamia
 De La Nuit...Le Jour (ECM, 1988)
 Solitudes (ECM, 1991)

With Manfred Schoof
 European Echoes (FMP)

With Michel Godard
 Saxophones (Intakt)
 Castel Del Monte (Enja)
 Deux (Altrisuoni)

With Jiří Stivín
 Výlety (Supraphon)
 Excursions II Twenty Years After (P&J Music)
With Joe McPhee
 Topology (Hat Hut, 1981)
With Michel Portal
 Splendid Yzlment (CBS)

With Barre Phillips
 Music by... (ECM, 1980)
 String Summit: One World In Eight (MPS)

With Dino Saluzzi
 Once Upon a Time - Far Away in the South (ECM, 1985)

With Mal Waldron
 Black Glory (Enja)

With London Jazz Composers Orchestra
 Double Trouble Two featuring Irene Schweizer, Marilyn Crispell and Pierre Favre (Intakt)

With Stefano Battaglia
 When We Were (Splasch)

With Paul Giger
 Alpstein (ECM, 1991)

With Furio Di Castri, Paolo Fresu & Jon Balke
 Mythscapes (Soul Note)

With Denis Levaillant
 Barium Circus (Nato)

With Yang Jing
  Two In One (Intakt)
 Moments 

With Andrea Centazzo
 Koans, Volume 1 (Ictus)
 Dialogues (Robi Droli/Newtone)

References

1937 births
Living people
Avant-garde jazz musicians
ECM Records artists
Jazz drummers
Swiss drummers
Swiss male musicians
Male drummers
Swiss jazz musicians
Swiss percussionists
Male jazz musicians
FMP/Free Music Production artists
Intakt Records artists
FMR Records artists
PolyGram artists